The Sijekovac killings, also called the Sijekovac massacre, refers to the killing of Serb civilians, in Sijekovac near Bosanski Brod, Bosnia and Herzegovina on 26 March 1992. The assailants were members of Croat and Bosniak army units. The exact number of casualties is unknown. The initial reported number was eleven, while the Republika Srpska authorities listed 47, however, exhumations in Sijekovac carried out for two weeks in 2004 unearthed 58 bodies of victims, of whom 18 were children.

Background
The fighting in Posavina began on 3 March 1992, after the Serbian Democratic Party (SDS) declared a Serb municipality in Bosanski Brod, trying to take control away from Bosniaks and Croats. Serbian Territorial Defense forces set up barricades in the town and tried to seize the strategically important bridge linking the town with Croatia, prompting the local Croats and Muslims to form a joint headquarters, and to request assistance from the Croatian Army, based just across the border in Slavonski Brod. According to a local report, 200 shells fell on Bosanski Brod on the first day of the Serb attack. Neither side managed to prevail, and the Yugoslav People's Army (JNA) sent its 327th Motorized Brigade to the city. Following a ceasefire of several weeks the JNA and Serb militias once again attacked the town, launching a heavy artillery bombardment and sniper fire, and looting took place in the Croat quarter of the town.

The Croats retaliated by attacking the village of Sijekovac on the right side of the Sava River, across from Croatia. At the time, as the Bosnian War was starting, it was still populated by members of all three ethnic groups of Bosnia and Herzegovina. After the initial reports in 1992, three members of the Presidency of Bosnia and Herzegovina arrived by helicopter to investigate a reported "dozen killed civilians". The initial reported number of victims was eleven.

Events
The detailed testimonies about the murders, tortures and rape that ensued after Croat units occupied the village were recorded by the ICTY but no one was ever indicted; instead all of the documentation was passed to courts in Sarajevo in 2004. The trial was underway in 2014. In July 2016 a written testimony of crimes emerged, documents allowing members of Croat units to sexually abuse imprisoned Serb women, signed by a local commander Ahmet Čaušević.

The authorities of Republika Srpska marked the site with a monument listing 47 casualties. Among those publicly implicated by the Serbian side are the 108th brigade of Croatian National Guard (by then renamed into the Croatian Army), the Intervention Squad of the Army of the Republic of Bosnia and Herzegovina and the Croatian Defence Forces.

In 2002, during the ICTY Prijedor massacre Trial against Milomir Stakić, former leader of the Bosnian Serbs in Prijedor, the Defence called a survivor of the alleged massacre in Sijekovac to support a claim that the Bosnian War was caused not by the Serbs, but by incursions into Bosnian territory by the Croatian army north of Bosanski Šamac.

In 2004, the judge of the Zenica-Doboj Court and member of the FBiH Commission for Tracing Missing persons, Enisa Adrović, noted that the exhumations which had taken 14 days recovered 58 corpses and was done under the supervision of Federation Commission for Missing Persons. The victims were mostly Serb civilians. The first 8 bodies found had personal objects (clothing, a belt, buttons, glasses), yet the remaining 49 [sic] bodies had no objects that could help in their identification. Among them there were 18 bodies of children. RS monitors mentioned the possibility of an illegal trade in human organs, as the victims were mostly naked.

Several exhumation officials initially suspected that most victims were civilians from Vukovar, including Goran Krcmar, a member of the Republika Srpska Office for Missing Persons and the District Prosecutor of Doboj, Slavko Krulj, who referenced the Veritas Information Center. No representatives from the Republic of Croatia's Office for Missing Persons were present at the exhumation. Savo Štrbac, Director of the Veritas Information Center, claimed the number of children found seemed to vastly exceed the number of children actually reported as missing from Sijekovac. , Veritas listed 22 Serb children missing from the Vukovar hospital in 1992. Tomo Aračić, president of Udruženje '92, the organization that initiated the exhumation in the first place, said that they had no actual information about any Vukovar children at Sijekovac. The presiding officer of the FBiH Commission for Missing Persons, Marko Jurišić, claimed the identities of the majority of the bodies were unknown and that only analysis by forensic experts could determine such details.

In May 2010, the leaders of Republika Srpska (Rajko Kuzmanović and Milorad Dodik), the Croatian president (Ivo Josipović) and a prominent Bosniak leader (Sulejman Tihić) all visited the site to pay respect to around fifty civilian victims of the March 1992 events, at the local Orthodox Church of Saint Marina the Martyr. The site and the visit provoked some controversy in Croatia, with allegations of impropriety levelled against President Josipović and the authorities of Republika Srpska for misattributing some of the casualties.

References

Sources

Bibliography

Bosnian War
Mass murder in 1992
1992 in Bosnia and Herzegovina
Massacres of Serbs
Bosniak war crimes in the Bosnian War
Croatian war crimes in the Bosnian War
March 1992 events in Europe